Raouf is a Muslim name originating from the Arabic word rauf meaning compassionate. It may refer to:

Abu Abdul Raouf Zalita v. George W. Bush, writ of habeas corpus filed on behalf of Guantanamo captive Abu Abdul Rauf Zalita
Ahmed Abdel-Raouf (born 1986), Egyptian footballer with Zamalek
Ahmed Raouf (born 1982), Egyptian footballer
Raouf Abbas (1939–2008), Egyptian historian and professor of modern history at Cairo University
Raouf Bouzaiene (born 1970), retired Tunisian football defender
Raouf Bundhun, Vice President of Mauritius from 2002 to 2007
Raouf Hannachi, Canadian citizen who served as the Muezzin at Assuna Mosque in Montreal
Raouf Salama Moussa (1929–2006), Egyptian bacteriologist and editor

References

Arabic-language surnames